Cylon (Greek: Κύλων Kylon) was an Athenian associated with the first reliably dated event in Athenian history, the Cylonian Affair, an attempted seizure of power in the city.

Cylon, one of the Athenian nobles and a previous victor of the Olympic Games, attempted a coup in 632 BC with support from Megara, where his father-in-law, Theagenes, was tyrant. The oracle at Delphi had advised him to seize Athens during a festival of Zeus, which Cylon understood to mean the Olympics. However, the coup was opposed, and Cylon and his supporters took refuge in Athena's temple on the Acropolis. Cylon and his brother escaped, but his followers were cornered by Athens' nine archons.  According to Plutarch and Thucydides (1.126), they were persuaded by the archons to leave the temple and stand trial after being assured that their lives would be spared.

In an effort to ensure their safety, the accused tied a rope to the temple's statue and went to the trial.  On the way, the rope (again, according to Plutarch) broke of its own accord. The Athenian archons, led by Megacles, took this as the goddess's repudiation of her suppliants and proceeded to stone them to death (on the other hand, Herodotus, 5.71, and Thucydides, 1.126, do not mention this aspect of the story, stating that Cylon's followers were simply killed after being convinced that they would not be harmed). Most likely, the story found in Plutarch is a later invention.

Cylonian curse 
Megacles and his genos, the Alcmaeonidae, were exiled from the city for violating the laws against killing suppliants.  The Alcmaeonidae were cursed with a miasma ("stain" or "pollution"), which was inherited by later generations, even after the genos retook control of Athens. Thucydides cited that aside from the nine archons and their descendants, one unidentified family was also included in the curse. Athens was purified from it by Epimenides of Phaestus. This Cretan seer was known as a close associate of Solon and a hermit who lived in a cave of Zeus. 

What would later be referred to as the Cylonian curse was used by the Spartans as a political tool to expel the families who opposed their ally Isagoras. These families, led by Cleisthenes, were descended from the families accursed for slaying the followers of Cylon.

In April 2016, two mass graves containing 80 bodies, some shackled, were found in Palaio Faliro, a suburb of Athens.  The skeletons date from the third quarter of the seventh century BC, and it has been suggested that they were the supporters of Cylon killed in the aftermath of his attempted coup.

References

632 BC deaths
7th-century BC Athenians
Ancient Olympic competitors
Government of ancient Athens
Archaic Athens
Year of birth unknown